The National Republican Army (abbreviated ENR) was the army of the Italian Social Republic (or RSI) from 1943 to 1945 that fought on the side of Nazi Germany during World War II.

The ENR was officially formed 28 October 1943, by merging former Royal Army units still loyal to fascist dictator Benito Mussolini and Italian pro-Nazi units raised by the Germans after the occupation of southern Italy.

History

As a consequence of the Allied invasion of Sicily in July 1943, political forces allied to king Victor Emmanuel III took power in Italy, imprisoned dictator Benito Mussolini and negotiated an armistice between Italy and the Allied armed forces that took effect on 8 September 1943.

On 12 September 1943, the Germans launched "Operation Oak" (Unternehmen Eiche) and rescued Mussolini. The Fascist Italian Social Republic (Repubblica Sociale Italiana, or RSI) was formed as a puppet state in northern Italy with Mussolini as its leader. Marshal Rodolfo Graziani was named as the RSI's Minister of Defense.

On 16 October, the Rastenburg Protocol was signed with Nazi Germany.  In accordance with this protocol, the RSI was allowed to raise division-sized military formations.  This allowed Graziani to raise four RSI divisions totaling 52,000 men. In July 1944, the first of these divisions completed training and was sent to the front.

Recruiting military forces was difficult for the RSI, as most of the Italian army had been interned by German forces in 1943, many Italians had been conscripted into forced labour in Germany and few wanted to fight on Nazi Germany's side after 8 September 1943. The RSI became so desperate for soldiers that it granted convicts freedom if they would join the army and the sentence of death was imposed on anyone who opposed being conscripted. Autonomous military forces in the RSI also fought against the Allies including the notorious Decima Flottiglia MAS under command of Prince Junio Valerio Borghese. Borghese held no allegiance to Mussolini and even suggested that he would take him prisoner if he could.

During the winter of 1944-1945, armed Italians were on both sides of the Gothic Line. On the Allied side were four Italian groups of volunteers from the old Italian army.  These troops (of the Italian Co-Belligerent Army) were equipped and trained by the British. On the Axis side were four RSI divisions.  Three of the RSI divisions, the 2nd Italian "Littorio" Infantry Division, the 3rd Italian "San Marco" Marine Division, and the 4th Italian "Monterosa" Alpine Division, were allocated to the LXXXXVII "Liguria" Army under Graziani and were placed to guard the western flank of the Gothic Line facing France. The fourth RSI division, the 1st Italian "Italia" Bersaglieri Division, was attached to the German 14th Army in a sector of the Apennine Mountains thought least likely to be attacked.

On 26 December 1944, several sizable RSI military units, including elements of the 4th Italian "Monterosa" Alpine Division and the 3rd Italian "San Marco" Marine Division, participated in Operation Winter Storm. This was a combined German and Italian offensive against the American 92nd Infantry Division. The battle was fought in the Apennines. While limited in scale, this was a successful offensive and the RSI units did their part.

In February 1945, the 92nd Infantry Division again came up against RSI units. This time it was Bersaglieri of the 1st Italian "Italia" Infantry Division. The Italians successfully halted the US division's advance. RSI Minister of Defense Graziani, was even able to say that he commanded an entire Army.  This was the Italo-German Liguria Army. However, the situation subsequently deteriorated for the Axis forces on the Gothic Line].

In late April, at Collecchio, the last remaining RSI troops were bottled up along with two Wehrmacht Divisions by the 1st Brazilian Division, being forced to surrender after some days of fighting.

On 29 April, Graziani surrendered and was present at Caserta when a representative of German General Heinrich von Vietinghoff-Scheel signed the unconditional instrument of surrender for all Axis forces in Italy.  But, possibly as a sign of the low esteem in which the Allies held the RSI, Graziani's signature was not required at Caserta. The surrender was to take effect on 2 May.  Graziani ordered the RSI forces under his command to lay down their arms on 1 May.

The military of the RSI suffered some 34,770 dead during the war and, given conventional killed-to-wounded and killed-to-missing ratios, probably in excess of 100,000 casualties total. The majority of deaths (~21,600) were incurred by anti-partisan formations, such as National Guards, Black Brigades, and Territorial Militia. The rest (~13,170) were incurred by regular military forces mostly facing the Allies. The dead break down as: 13,500 members of the Guardia Nazionale Repubblicana and Milizia Difesa Territoriale, 6,200 members of the Black Brigades, 2,800 Aeronautica Nazionale Repubblicana personnel, 1,000 Marina Nazionale Repubblicana personnel, 1,900 X MAS personnel, 800 soldiers of the "Monterosa" Division, 470 soldiers of the "Italia" Division, 1,500 soldiers of the "San Marco" Division, 300 soldiers of the "Littorio" Division, 350 soldiers of the "Tagliamento" Alpini Regiment, 730 soldiers of the 3rd and 8th Bersaglieri regiments, 4,000 troops of miscellaneous units of the Esercito Nazionale Repubblicano (excluding the above-mentioned Divisions and Alpini and Bersaglieri Regiments), 300 members of the Legione Autonoma Mobile "Ettore Muti", 200 members of the Raggruppamento Anti Partigiani, 550 members of the Italian SS, and 170 members of the Cacciatori degli Appennini Regiment.

Organization

The ENR consisted of four infantry divisions which were raised, trained, and equipped in Germany:

 1st Bersaglieri Division "Italia"
 2nd Grenadier Division "Littorio"
 3rd Marine Infantry Division "San Marco"
 4th Alpine Division "Monterosa"

There were also a large number of smaller autonomous units.

Ranks

See also
 Battle of Garfagnana
 Italian Campaign (World War II)
 Italian Co-belligerent Army
 Mediterranean and Middle East theatre of World War II
 Military history of Italy during World War II
 Royal Italian Army

References

Sources
 

 
 
 
 
 

Military units and formations of Italy in World War II
Italian Army (pre-1946)
Military units and formations established in 1943
Military units and formations disestablished in 1945
1943 establishments in Italy
1945 disestablishments in Italy
Disbanded armies
Italian Social Republic